The Future with Confidence (AEC) is a liberal-conservative and anti-independence electoral alliance of political parties in New Caledonia. It forms part of the anti-separatist and French loyalist bloc in the Congress of New Caledonia. 

The alliance was founded in February 2019 as a common list for the 2019 New Caledonian legislative election and contains an amalgamation of four political parties which include: The Caledonian Republicans, The Rally, The Caledonian People's Movement (MPC) and All Caledonians.

Ideologically, the group holds the common aim of opposing separatist and nationalist movements in New Caledonia by supporting New Caledonia's status as part of overseas France. It supports the Nouméa Accord but endorsed a No vote in each independence referendum and urged for the referendums to be held rapidly in order to create a coherent anti-separatist campaign before each. Additionally, the group supports strict policies on security and law & order, and for all groups in New Caledonia to be respected and have rights.

References

External links 

 

Political parties in New Caledonia
Political parties established in 2019
Conservative parties in France